Waunakee Community High School is a public high school located in Waunakee, Wisconsin. It is part of the Waunakee Community School District and part of the Badger Conference in athletics. The attendance area includes the village of Waunakee, most of the town of Westport, portions of the cities of Middleton and Madison, and portions of the towns of Dane, Springfield, and Vienna.

Campus 
The oldest part of the building opened in 1972, including the old gym, library, and small auditorium. A 1993 addition added more classrooms and a greenhouse on the west side of the building, and a second gym (fieldhouse) was added on the east side of the building. A new commons area, pool, 679-seat performing arts center, fieldhouse expansion, and two wings of classrooms were added to the south side of the building in 2005, in addition to renovations in other areas and new athletic fields. There is a rock art mural displaying Wisconsin's natural and cultural history in the commons. In 2012, a second floor over a portion of the 2005 addition and a new main office area were added.

Extracurricular activities

Athletics 
Athletic teams include:
 Boys' and girls' cross country
 Boys' and girls' soccer
 Boys' and girls' golf
 Boys' and girls' swimming
 Boys' and girls' tennis
 Boys' and girls' track
 Boys' and girls' lacrosse
 Boys' and girls' basketball
 Boys' and girls' ski and snowboard team
 Football
 Baseball
 Football cheerleading
 Dance team
 Gymnastics
 Baseball
 Softball
 Volleyball
 Wrestling
 Boys' and girls' hockey
 Equestrian team

Waunakee has had a long time rivalry with fellow Badger North Conference member the DeForest Norskies.

Football 
The Waunakee Warriors have made the playoffs in 24 consecutive seasons, won seven state championships (1999, 2002, 2009, 2010, 2011, 2017, 2021), finished runner-up four times (2001, 2005, 2012, 2019), and won 16 conference championships (1998–2001, 2003–2012, 2015–2018). The team shared the state-record for consecutive wins with 48 straight victories from 2009 to 2012, when the record was broken by Kimberly High School in 2016.

Golf (girls)
2010 State champion

Aquatic center 
Waunakee High School is equipped with an eight-lane, twenty-five yard pool that is home to the Waunakee Warriors boys' and girls' swim teams. The aquatic center is also open for the community and non-community members for open family swims, fitness swims, swimming lessons and more.

Student newspaper 
Waunakee High School’s monthly newspaper is called the Purple Sage. The Purple Sage is printed along with Waunakee’s community newspaper, the Waunakee Tribune. The paper was reestablished in 2002 after a several year hiatus and has been published ever since.

Kokopelli Kafe 
Located in Waunakee High School’s school store is Kokopelli Kafe, a coffee shop that sells beverages and treats. Kokopelli Kafe is run by Waunakee High School's students with special needs. It teaches the students transitional work skills and provides interaction between students. Kokopelli Kafe philosophy is reflected in the goal: “Kokopelli Kafe is a school based business that enables students to learn functional, transitional, vocational, and social skill in a “real life” environment.”

Clubs 

Waunakee Community High School offers clubs relating to construction, arts, chemicals, agriculture, sports, culture, business, and more. Students in Pay it Forward participate in volunteer work and support local and distant communities. Clubs are set up and run by students and staff. Clubs include Science Olympiad, Gaming Club, Science Club, Model United Nations, Young Progressives, Young Conservatives, Aviation Club, Above the Influence (ATI) Club, Spanish Club, Drama Club, French Club, FBLA, DECA, FFA, HOSA, SkillsUSA, GSA, FCCLA, Mock Trial, Pay it Forward, National Honor Society (regular, art, and Spanish), and Fishing Club.

Fine arts 
Waunakee's Fine Arts Department includes programs in band, orchestra, choir, and drama. Offerings include concert band, symphonic band, wind ensemble, Warrior band, jazz ensemble, jazz combo, chorale, concert choir, Grazioso, a capella choir, Kee Notes vocal jazz, philharmonic orchestra, chamber orchestra, symphony orchestra, folk band, consort, music theory and composition, jazz improvisation, and music history.

The WHS drama department participates in the WHSFA One Act Festival each fall. On the first weekend in May, it produces a musical in even-numbered years and a full length non-musical play in odd-numbered years.

Controversies

Furry Protocol 
On March 17, 2022, multiple articles were released accusing Waunakee schools of allowing students to identify and even dress up as furries. These allegations extended to claims that students where engaging in behaviors such as barking and growling. Waunakee Community School District Superintendent Randy Guttenberg spoke out against the allegations, saying that "the Waunakee Community School District do have protocols for Furries, we do allow disruptions in our school and classrooms." Five staff have reported that 12 students engaged in any of the alleged behavior.

References

External links
Waunakee High School website
Waunakee Football website
Waunakee Music website
The Purple Sage website

Public high schools in Wisconsin
Schools in Dane County, Wisconsin
Educational institutions established in 1972
1972 establishments in Wisconsin